Doctor John Witherspoon is a bronze sculpture by William Couper of John Witherspoon, Presbyterian minister and a signatory of the United States Declaration of Independence.

It was dedicated May 20, 1909, by the National Presbyterian Church, and relocated in 1966.
It is located at Connecticut Avenue and N Street, N.W. Washington, D.C.

As part of American Revolution Statuary in Washington, D.C., the statue is listed on the National Register of Historic Places.

See also
 List of public art in Washington, D.C., Ward 2

References

External links
 

1909 sculptures
Witherspoon
Bronze sculptures in Washington, D.C.
Dupont Circle
Historic district contributing properties in Washington, D.C.
Statues of U.S. Founding Fathers